The Church of the Sacred Heart is a Roman Catholic parish church under the authority of the Roman Catholic Archdiocese of New York, located in Staten Island, New York City. The parish was established in 1875. After much financial difficulty, the church building was gradually renovated and extended to cater to the growing congregation and finished in 1900. The affiliated parish elementary school and the Schoenstatt "Shrine of Light" are located across Castleton Avenue.

References

External links
Official Website

Roman Catholic churches in Staten Island
Religious organizations established in 1875